Grand Hotel van Cleef is an independent record label headquartered in Hamburg, Germany.

Label history

Grand Hotel van Cleef was founded in September 2002 by the musicians Thees Uhlmann, Marcus Wiebusch and Reimer Bustorff. The newly formed band of Bustorff an Wiebusch Kettcar had recently recorded their first album, Du und wie viel von deinen Freunden, (engl.: You and how many of your friends) but they found no label to release it. In addition, it was clear that Uhlmann's band Tomte would release their third album Hinter all diesen Fenstern (engl.: Behind all these windows). The big fan base even before the publication was ultimately the deciding factor to start the label.
The name originated from a joke: On Thees Uhlmann's question on how to call the label, Tomte's ex-drummer Timo Bodenstein said "Hotel van Cleef" - he was working in the restaurant business, and it should be called something with gastronomy. So they decided to call Tomte's label Hotel van Cleef. Due to the merger with Marcus Wiebusch's B.A. Records, it was renamed to Grand Hotel van Cleef.
In 2004 the musicians Thees Uhlmann, Marcus Wiebusch, Felix Gebhard and Max Schroeder, who were all signed to Grand Hotel Van Cleef, wrote the soundtrack for the film , Hansen Band. Actor Jürgen Vogel contributed in the songwriting.
The label's biggest chart success was the publication of Buchstaben über der Stadt by Tomte and Thees Uhlmann's solo debut album, both on fourth place. and the publications Von Spatzen und Tauben, Dächern und Händen and Sylt by the band Kettcar, each of which reached the fifth place. This success was topped by Kettcar's latest Release Ich vs. Wir (engl.: Me versus Us) that could reach the fourth place in the German music chart. Hansen Band and Young Rebel Set, Kilians and Fjørt also released albums that could enter the German music chart.

After releasing their own records, Grand Hotel began signing and producing other indie music acts, and have built a reputation as the most important label for alternative German guitar pop. Notable albums include that by the fictional Hansen Band, a band invented by movie maker Lars Kraume for his 2005 movie  (Uhlmann and Wiebusch trained actor Jürgen Vogel on how to adopt the proper rock pose).

Fest van Cleef 
Since 2006, the Grand Hotel van Cleef also organizes its own open air festival, "Fest van Cleef." This concert takes place on three days in three different cities each year.

August 2006, in Hannover, Trier and Bonn: Tomte, Kettcar, The Weakerthans, Olli Schulz und der Hund Marie, Pale, Home of the Lame
July 2007, in Potsdam, Bremen and Karlsruhe: Kettcar, Kante, Bernd Begemann, Maritime, Hansen Band, Kilians
July 2008, in Mannheim, Köln and Großefehn: Kettcar, Tomte, Robocop Kraus, I Am Kloot, Niels Frevert, Ghost of Tom Joad
July 2009, in Northeim, Freiburg and Essen: Element of Crime, Tomte, Why?, Muff Potter, Kilians, Gisbert zu Knyphausen
December 2010, in Bielefeld, Berlin and Mainz: Kettcar, Thees Uhlmann, Tim Neuhaus, Gisbert zu Knyphausen, An Horse, Beat! Beat! Beat!, Nils Koppruch, Young Rebel Set
December 2011, in Bielefeld, Trier and Dresden: Element Of Crime, Thees Uhlmann, Casper, Frank Turner, Ghost of Tom Joad, ClickClickDecker, Moritz Krämer, Maike Rosa Vogel
August 2017, in Hamburg at mehr! Theater am Großmarkt: Kettcar, Thees Uhlmann & Band, Fortuna Ehrenfeld, Gisbert zu Knyphausen

Artists 

 Adam Angst
 An Horse
 Bernd Begemann & die Befreiung
 Der Hund Marie
 Der Herr Polaris
 Dorit Jakobs
 East Cameron Folkcore
 Escapado
 Fjørt
 Hansen Band
 Home of the Lame
 Imaginary Cities
 John K. Samson
 Kettcar
 Lirr
 Maritime
 Marr
 Ola Podrida
 Pale
 Propagandhi
 Tim Neuhaus
 Tomte (band)
 Torpus & The Art Directors
 Young Rebel Set

Former artists
 Olli Schulz & der Hund Marie (moved to Audiolith Records, subsequently EMI, now inactive)
 Death Cab for Cutie (now: Atlantic Records)

References

External links

 Website of Grand Hotel van Cleef
 Interview with Reimer Bustorff

Companies based in Hamburg
German independent record labels